The 1989–90 Scottish League Cup was the forty-fourth season of Scotland's second football knockout competition. The competition was won by Aberdeen, who defeated Rangers in the Final.

First round

Second round

Third round

Quarter-finals

Semi-finals

Final

References

General

Specific

League Cup
Scottish League Cup seasons